Sitovo may refer to the following Bulgarian villages:

 Sitovo, Plovdiv Province
 Sitovo, Silistra Province, the administrative centre of Sitovo municipality
 Sitovo, Yambol Province
 Sitovo - in Poland